1000 Fires is the debut studio album by American singer and actress Traci Lords, released on February 28, 1995, by Radioactive Records. The album remains her only full-length music release to date. Lords started working on the album in April 1994, and collaborated with producers Juno Reactor, Mike Edwards and Babble. Executive produced by Gary Kurfirst, 1000 Fires is predominantly influenced by electronic music with elements of techno, trance and trip hop. Lyrically, it mostly focuses on dark themes, referring to Lords' past in the porn industry, revealing her rape experience on the song "Father's Field" or dealing with thoughts of suicide on "Fallen Angel".

Upon its release, the album received mixed reviews from music critics. It achieved moderate commercial success, but failed to enter the Billboard 200. It is currently out of print. During the promotion of the album, Lords performed as a DJ and opened shows for other artists such as Moby and the band My Life with the Thrill Kill Kult.

Two singles from the album were released. The lead single, "Control", peaked at number two on the Billboard Hot Dance Club Songs and its instrumental version was featured in the film Mortal Kombat (1995). The soundtrack to the film was certified double platinum by the Recording Industry Association of America (RIAA), which earned Lords her first music award. Its following single, "Fallen Angel", was also successful in charts, peaking at number eleven on Hot Dance Club Songs. The Paul Oakenfold remix of the song was included on the soundtrack to the film Virtuosity (1995), in which Lords had a cameo appearance.

Background and recording
After her departure from the adult film industry and transition to mainstream films, Lords got signed for a development deal with Capitol Records, but was later dropped due to disagreements between her and the label. "They wanted to market me in the way that would make the most money. They wanted to make me the new Samantha Fox. And I never wanted that. That wasn't what it was about for me. I pretty much had a sense of myself, and I knew that I would be an imposter," Lords said.

Following the split up from her husband Brook Yeaton, Lords decided to focus on her career outside acting. She began taking vocal lessons and was encouraged by her coach to search for a new record deal. After meeting with American DJ Rodney Bingenheimer at a birthday party, she was recommended to Jeff Jacklin, who hired her to record the song "Love Never Dies" for the 1992 film Pet Sematary Two. The producer of the soundtrack, Gary Kurfirst, signed her for a development deal with his label Radioactive Records.

In April 1994, the label arranged her to fly to London and meet with producer Tom Bailey. They recorded the songs "I Want You", "Fly" and "Just Like Honey", which was later re-recorded by Keith Fernley of Bailey's group Babble with a different set of lyrics and became the song "Father's Field". Lords used lyrics she had previously written in New Zealand based on her personal journals she kept since she was a child. After finishing her recording with Bailey, Lords wanted something with a harder edge to add another dimension to her album. She was introduced to producer Ben Watkins of the electronic group Juno Reactor and decided to incorporate more rave sound. Mainly inspired by the music she would hear at warehouse parties during her stay in London, Lords teamed up with American singer Wonder with whom she created the lyrics to the song "Control". Lords later commented on the inspiration behind the album's sound: "It was in England that I fell in love with techno music. I was working in the UK doing some modelling a couple of years ago, and I was sharing a flat with some other girls in South London. We were really broke, and the cheapest place to go and have a good night out were raves - you could get in for about three bucks. So I went to a lot of raves and clubs, and I fell in love with the music - it was something that wasn't happening in the States at the time." Lords recorded three more songs with Watkins; "Good-N-Evil", "Outlaw Lover" and "Fallen Angel".

Later she met Mike Edwards, the lead singer of the band Jesus Jones. They recorded the songs "Distant Land", "Say Something" and "Okey Dokey"; the latter of which they recorded as a joke at the end of a recording session.

Title and artwork
When asked about the album's title, Lords said: "I think that fire is something that's really representative of the record. It's really, really peaceful and you're drawn to it. But if you get too close, it can torch you and kill you. But if you just get close enough, it's warm and it's soothing, it's mesmerising and it's peaceful. It can give you everything or destroy you, depending on how smart you are." The cover sleeve was shot by Joshua Jordan.

Composition

The album's opening track and lead single, "Control", is an up-tempo electronic song. Heavily influenced by techno and trance, it contains a prominent electric guitar riff. "I told Ben [Watkins] I wanted to do a song that had elements of rock and roll but with a techno vibe and he ran with it, creating a slamming heavy metal guitar intro on an insanely hyper track." The song is about a dominant female who nurses a broken heart as she sings, "Let me kiss it and make it better/After tonight you will forget her". "Fallen Angel" is also an up-tempo techno-trance song with elements of ambient music. It features Spanish guitar and castanets. The lyrics were influenced by and written surrounding the death of Kurt Cobain. The third track, "Good-N-Evil", incorporates elements of industrial music. "Fly" is a mid-tempo song built around a trip hop beat. The album's fifth track and the only ballad on the album, "Distant Land", contains elements of ambient music and features mellow guitar melody. Lyrically, the song is a tale of a woman waking up lost and not knowing where she is, searching for light in a distant land.

"Outlaw Lover", the sixth track from the album, is an up-tempo electronic song. It contains strong techno elements and features male opera vocals. Lords cast herself as a woman in a small town who had been wronged, and tells her unfaithful lover "You best be warned I'm a woman scorned," before shooting him dead. The lyrics were inspired by cowboy stories and old westerns. The following track, "I Want You", is another song with strong trip hop influences and oriental vibe. "Say Something" also incorporates trip hop music within its composition. In the album's ninth track, "Father's Field", Lords reveals her experience with rape when she was 10 years old. She was attacked by her 16-year-old classmate in the back of her father's house.

Release and promotion
Following the release of the album, Lords embarked on a small tour performing as a DJ, mostly in the Miami club scene. On August 12, 1995, she was the opening act of the Lollapalooza after party, Enit Festival, alongside Moby, Sven Väth, DJ Keoki and Single Cell Orchestra.

"Control" was released as the lead single from the album on December 20, 1994. The song received critical acclaim, especially for its rave sound which was unexpected from Lords. It peaked at number two on the Billboard Hot Dance Club Songs and number 84 on the UK Singles Chart. Its instrumental version was featured on the soundtrack to the 1995 film Mortal Kombat. The music video was shot in Los Angeles, California, and was inspired by James Bond with Lords portraying the female version of the character.

The album's second single, "Fallen Angel", released on August 3, 1995, was also successful in charts, peaking at number eleven on Hot Dance Club Songs. Lords managed to get Paul Oakenfold add the song to his DJ set. His remix of the song was included on the soundtrack to the film Virtuosity (1995), in which Lords had a cameo. Two music videos for the song were released: one features the original version of the song and was shot during the making of the film Virtuosity; the second version, directed by Stéphane Sednaoui, features the "Honeymoon Stitch Mix", produced by Chad Smith and Dave Navarro, then of Red Hot Chili Peppers.

Reception

Upon its release, 1000 Fires received mixed reviews from music critics. Stephen Thomas Erlewine at AllMusic gave it three stars out of five, calling it "a competent exercise in techno". He criticized Lords' vocals as being "thin" and not having much range, but also remarked that "she does have a forceful and distinctive personality, which gives the record a cohesive sound." Benjamin Svetkey at Entertainment Weekly gave the album a B+, referring to Lords as "Moby with estrogen injections". The Guardian stated that "there's no saying a former under-age porn star can't make decent records and – shock! – that's exactly what her debut album is." noting that her "come-hither whisper works well on ambient items like Distant Land." while the album was brought down by "some terrible dance-by-numbers things"

Despite the good chart position of the lead single, 1000 Fires did not achieve mainstream success. Lords later commented: "The problem with that album was that it was ahead of its time. Electronica was just starting to happen. Moby was just starting to be huge. I opened for Thrill Kill Kult and Moby as a DJ back then. The masses didn't know who Moby was. I think if it had been slightly delayed it would have done better. Madonna had it right to wait for Ray of Light. She has been a lot better with her timing than me. I am proud of that album because I hear it now and it still feels current. It doesn't feel dated."

Track listing

Notes
  signifies an additional producer

Credits and personnel

Traci Lords – vocals
Gary Kurfirst – executive production
Juno Reactor – programming, production
Babble – production
Mike Edwards – production, remixing
Nick Burton – drums (track 3)
B. J. Cole – pedal steel guitar (track 6)
Ronald Sam – operatic vocals (track 6)
Otto the Barbarian – engineering (tracks 1–3, 6)
Nahoko Maehara – engineering assistance (tracks 1–3)
Keith Fernley – engineering, mixing, production assistance (tracks 4, 7, 9)
Mike Ash – remixing (track 4)
Ian Richardson – engineering (tracks 5, 8, 10)
Eddy Schreyer – mastering

Tim Stedman – art direction
Joshua Jordan – photography
REY International – design

Credits adapted from the album's liner notes.

Chart performance

Singles

References

External links
[ 1000 Fires] at AllMusic

Traci Lords albums
1995 debut albums
Radioactive Records albums